Nelson "Boy" Lechoncito Dayanghirang is a Filipino politician serving as the representative of Davao Oriental's 1st district since June 30, 2022 and previously from 2007 to 2016. He was the governor of Davao Oriental from 2016 to 2022.

References

External links
Province of Davao Oriental Official Website

Living people
Hugpong ng Pagbabago politicians
People from Davao Oriental
Year of birth missing (living people)
Members of the House of Representatives of the Philippines from Davao Oriental
Governors of Davao Oriental